The 2020–21 Spezia Calcio season was the club's 115th season in existence and the club's first season in the top flight of Italian football. In addition to the domestic league, Spezia participated in this season's edition of the Coppa Italia. The season covered the period from 3 August 2020 to 30 June 2021.

Players

First-team squad

Out on loan

Pre-season and friendlies

Competitions

Overview

Note: Coppa Italia match against Roma originally ended in a 4–2 win.

Serie A

League table

Results summary

Results by round

Matches
The League fixtures were announced on 2 September 2020.

Coppa Italia

Statistics

Appearances and goals

|-
! colspan=14 style=background:#dcdcdc; text-align:center| Goalkeepers

|-
! colspan=14 style=background:#dcdcdc; text-align:center| Defenders

|-
! colspan=14 style=background:#dcdcdc; text-align:center| Midfielders

|-
! colspan=14 style=background:#dcdcdc; text-align:center| Forwards

|-
! colspan=14 style=background:#dcdcdc; text-align:center| Players transferred out during the season

Goalscorers

References

External links

Spezia Calcio seasons
Spezia